Adrienne Moore may refer to:

 Adrienne Kennaway (born 1945), née Moore, New Zealand book illustrator
 Adrienne C. Moore (born 1980), American actress